Alarcón is a municipality in the province of Cuenca, in the autonomous community of Castilla-La Mancha, Spain.

Geography

Located 87 kilometers (54 miles) south of the city of Cuenca, Alarcón spans an area of 120 km² (50 sq mi) at an elevation of 831 meters (2,726 feet). It is situated on a promontory within a closed bend of the Júcar River. Not far downstream from the Alarcón Dam, an important reservoir, the town also has the smaller Dam of Henchidero at its doorstep.

Demographics

According to the 2013 municipal registry of the National Statistics Institute (INE, Instituto Nacional de Estadística), the town population of 159 inhabitants yields a density of 1.3 people per km² (3.4 per sq mi).

History

Of Iberian and Roman origins, Alarcón first appears in recorded history at its occupation by the Arabs, to whom it owes the construction of the primitive castle on which the existing one is based. The history of Alarcón is governed by its role as a stronghold; however, the castle is not the town’s only precious heritage: it also claims a rich architectural variety, both religious (the Churches of Santo Domingo de Silos, San Juan Bautista, the Santa Trinidad, and Santa María del Campo, as well as the Hermitage of Santa María de la Orden), and civil (the town hall, the House of Villena, and the Castañeda Palace).

The town of Alarcón was declared the site of a Historic-Artistic Grouping (Conjunto Histórico-Artistico) on July 3, 1981.

In 1994, artist Jesús Mateo began a project to paint the interior of the old Church of San Juan Bautista, creating the Mural Paintings of Alarcón (1994-2002), which were recognized by UNESCO in 1997 for their global artistic interest.

Notable people

  (1395 – after 1451), Augustinian writer who expounded the Bible at the monastery of his order in Florence, Italy, and at various monasteries in Valladolid and other places
 Juan Manuel, Prince of Villena, author of the famous Tales of Count Lucanor (Libro de los ejemplos del conde Lucanor y de Patronio)
 Jesús Mateo (born 1971), Spanish painter and author of the Mural Paintings of Alarcón

Government

Monuments

Castle of Alarcón

Of Muslim origin, this medieval fortress was constructed in the 8th century and conquered by King Alfonso VIII in 1184. The castle sits atop a promontory inside a bend of the Júcar River, creating a formidable stronghold whose battlements provide an impressive view to the border with Valencia. The keep, built around 1460 by Castilian nobleman Juan Pacheco, serves as the fortress’s trademark feature. The historical figure Juan Manuel, Prince of Villena, who wrote the Tales of Count Lucanor, once lived within the castle walls.

The fortress was restored on various occasions throughout its history. In 1963, after years of neglect, the castle was expropriated from the Torrijos family by politician Manuel Fraga Iribarne and subsequently restored by the national tourism organization Turespaña, who opened its doors as a Parador hotel in 1966. Tours of the castle are currently offered by local guides.

Church of Santo Domingo de Silos

This 13th century church was built in the late Romanesque style. Of the original structure, both the semicircular apse in the nave and the southern portal have been preserved. The portal’s splayed arch consists of three colonnettes per doorjamb, capped by pointed proto-Gothic archivolts. In the 16th century, the square tower and the walls of the nave were built following Renaissance designs, while the Baroque period saw the modification of the ceiling with a ribbed barrel vault. Today the church has been adapted for use as an exhibition hall and auditorium. It was declared a national monument on February 19, 1992.

Art Center – The Murals of Alarcón; Old Church of San Juan Bautista

The current structure dates from the 16th century as a replacement of the previous Romanesque building. It has a single nave covered with a barrel vault, a portal in the Herrerian style, and a tower that remains from the original church. Buttresses stabilize the lateral walls; however, contrary to custom, they are located in the interior and thus divide the space into smaller areas that serve as tiny chapels. In 1995, the young Spanish painter Jesús Mateo began the project of covering the totality of the old structure in a set of mural paintings. UNESCO has officially sponsored this work since 1997 for its global artistic interest, as it is considered one of the greatest examples of contemporary art worldwide. It has drawn more than 40,000 visitors annually since its opening to the public, and received support from many scholars and artists.

Church of the Santa Trinidad

This structure comprises two naves, dating from the 13th and 16th centuries respectively, although the vault in the older nave was built in the 15th century. Of note are its pointed ribbed side arches, its chancel arch, and its Renaissance altar. The original Romanesque apse, circular in form, has been replaced by the current rectangular one. The portal is typically Plateresque; it bears the coats of arms of the Marquis of Villena, Diego López Pacheco, and of his contemporary, Bishop Diego Ramírez Villaescusa. The church tower stands on a portal known as the arco de la villa (town gate).

Church of Santa María del Campo

This building presently serves as a parish church. Erected at the beginning of the 16th century, it was constructed in the Plateresque style and features Gothic tracery in the vault.

See also

 List of municipalities in Cuenca
 List of Bienes de Interés Cultural in the Province of Cuenca
 List of castles in Spain

Notes

References
 Salas Parrilla, Miguel. Alarcón, Belmonte y Garcimuñoz. Tres castillos del señorío de Villena en la provincia de Cuenca. Madrid: author, 1997.
 Muñoz, José Luis. El sueño eterno. Al borde de Alarcón. Cuenca: Ediciones Olcades, 2011.

External links 
 

Municipalities in the Province of Cuenca
Bien de Interés Cultural landmarks in the Province of Cuenca